Queen Dugu is a 2019 Chinese web series starring Joe Chen and Chen Xiao. It is based on the life of Dugu Jialuo and her husband Yang Jian, the founder of the Sui dynasty. It started airing online via iQiyi, Youku and Tencent on February 11, 2019.

Plot
After her family was accused of treason, Dugu Jialuo was determined to be brave and independent. Her husband Yang Jian was also extraordinary. He ascended to the throne during times of war and established the Sui Dynasty. With the assistance of Jialuo, they created a prosperous country from scratch. As Emperor and Empress, they strengthened the economy and respected the civilians. As husband and wife, they loved and trusted each other deeply.

Cast

Main

 Joe Chen as Dugu Jialuo, Empress Wenxian of Sui
 Youngest daughter of the Dugu family. Due to her family misfortunes, Dugu Jialuo has developed a perceptive insight since young. She is intelligent and wise, and is adept at handling political matters.
 Chen Xiao as Yang Jian, Emperor Wen of Sui
 Eldest son of Yang Zhong.

Supporting

Yang Family

 Song Yi Xing as Yang Lihua, Princess Leping of Sui
 Crown Princess (Northern Zhou) → Empress Tianyuan (Northern Zhou) → Grand Empress Tianyuan (Northern Zhou) → Princess Leping. Dugu Jialuo and Yang Jian's daughter. Wife of Yuwen Yun.
 Zhang Lei as Yang Zhong
 Duke of Sui. Father of Yang Jian.
 Li Zheng Yang as Yang Zheng
 Second son of Yang family.
 Ying Zi as Yuchi Rong
 Yuchi Jiong's daughter, wife of Yang Zheng. She harbors a grudge toward Dugu Jialuo, as the latter exposed her extramarital affair with her first love, causing her to lose her husband's favor.
 Fang Yi Lun as Yang Zan, Prince of Tai 
 Duke of Shao (Northern Zhou) → Prince of Tai. Third son of Yang family. He is adept at the arts of music.
 Liu Zhe Hui as Yang Shuang, Prince of Wei 
 Tongan Jungong (Northern Zhou) → General of Northern Zhou → Prince of Wei. Youngest son of Yang family.
 Xu Xiao Han as Chen Wanyi, Lady Xuanhua of Sui
 Princess of Southern Chen → Palace maid → Lady Xunhua. She was taken as a consort by Yang Jian

 Tang Xiao Tian as Yang Yong, Crown Prince of Sui
 Marquess of Boping (Northern Zhou) →  Duke of Changning (Northern Zhou) → Grand Marshall (Northern Zhou) → Crown Prince. Yang Jian and Dugu Jialuo's eldest son. He was later disposed of his position, stripped of his title and became a commoner.
 Ren Wanqing as Yuan Zhen, First Crown Princess of Sui
 Daughter of Founding Minister Yuan.
 Lu Yan as Gao Ling, Second Crown Princess of Sui
 Daughter of Gao Jiong.
 Zhu Lingwu as Yun Ruoxia
 Concubine of Yang Yong.
 Ma Xin Ming as Yang Guang, Emperor Yang of Sui
 General of Northern Zhou → Prince Jin → Crown Prince → Emperor. Yang Jian and Dugu Jialuo's second son, who later become the second Emperor of Sui.
 Yang Tian Yuan as Xiao Qiang, Empress Xiao of Sui
 Princess of Western Liang → Princess Consort Jin → Crown Princess → Empress. Wife of Yang Guang.

Dugu Family

 Qin Yan as Dugu Xin
 Duke of Wei.
 Guo Hong as Lady Cui
 Dugu Xin's wife.
 Xu Xiao Han as Empress Dugu
 Eldest daughter of the Dugu family. Wife of Yuwen Yu. 
 Yang Bo as Dugu Shan
 Eldest son of the Dugu family.
 Chen Heng as Shangguan Ying'e
 Dugu Shan's wife.

Yuchi Family

 Sun Lei as Yuchi Jiong
 General of Northern Zhou, later Regent of Xiangchuan of Northern Zhou.
 Zhang Lin as Yuchi Kuan
 Yuchi Jiong's son.
 Sun Mengjia as Zhao Yan
 Yuchi Kuan's wife. Zhao Gui's daughter.
 Ying Zi as Yuchi Rong
 Yuchi Jiong's daughter, wife of Yang Zheng.
 Gu Yu Han as Yuchi Wenji
 Yuchi Kuan and Zhao Yan's daughter. She was a palace maid in Sui palace, and later attracted the attention of Yang Jian. She was later killed by Dugu Jialuo for seducing her husband.
 Zhang Jing as Yuchi Chifan
 Yuchi Jiong's granddaughter. One of Yuwen Yun's five empresses.

Yuwen Family

 Jiang Kai as Yuwen Hu, Grand Preceptor of Northern Zhou
 A vicious and merciless man who takes charge of the political affairs in court and wields great power.
 Qian Yong Chen as Yuwen Yu, Emperor Ming of Northern Zhou
 Xu Xiao Han as Empress Dugu, Empress Mingjing of Northern Zhou
 Wife of Yuwen Yu.
 Chen Ruoxi as Yun Chan, Second Empress of Northern Zhou
 Niece of Yuwen Hu. She was used as a political tool by Yuwen Hu to spy on Yuwen Yu.
 Qi Ji as Yuwen Yong, Emperor Wu of Northern Zhou
 Duke of Lu  → Emperor. Dugu Jialuo's first love and childhood friend; the two separated as Dugu Jialuo could not accept the idea of sharing a husband with another woman. During his captive as a "puppet ruler", he was aided by Yang Jian and Dugu Qieluo who helped him get freed. However, his suspicious nature later caused him to grow distrustful of Yang Jian.
 Hai Lu as Ashina Song, Empress Wucheng of Northern Zhou
 Princess of Tujue  → Duchess of Lu  → Empress. She was married to Yuwen Yong through a political marriage between two countries. She resents Dugu Jialuo as Yuwen Yong loved her.
 Xi Zi as Yuwen Zhu, Princess Shunyang of Northern Zhou 
 Yang Zan's wife.
 Wang Xin Yu as Yuwen Yun, Emperor Xuan of Northern Zhou
 Duke of Lu  → Crown prince  → Emperor. Eldest son of Yuwen Yong.
 Song Yi Xing as Yang Lihua, Grand Empress Tianyuan of Northern Zhou 
 One of Yuwen Yun's five empresses.
 Jiao Na as Zhu Manyue, Empress Tianyuan of Northern Zhou
 One of Yuwen Yun's five empresses.
 Chen Qian as Chen Yueyi, Empress Tianzhong of Northern Zhou
 One of Yuwen Yun's five empresses.
 Zhang Jing as Yuchi Chifan, Empress Tianzuo of Northern Zhou
 One of Yuwen Yun's five empresses.
 Yuan Weiyi as Yuan Leshang, Empress Tianyou of Northern Zhou
 One of Yuwen Yun's five empresses.
 Ye Kaiwen as Yuwen Xian
 Son of Yuwen Yu and Empress Mingjing.
 Wu Hong as Yuwen Hui
 Son of Yuwen Hu.

Northern country

 Peng Bo as Ashina Yanyu
 Prince of Tujue. Ashina's brother.
 Ba Yuan as Tardu
 Li Chengjia as Jieji Khagan
 Peng Bo as Jieha Khagan

Others

 Zhang Lu as Gao Jiong
 General of Northern Zhou, later Prime Minister of Sui. Childhood friend of Dugu Jialuo and Yuwen Yong.
 Yan Su as Yang Su
 Supreme general of Northern Zhou, later Prime Minister of Sui. Close friend of Yang Jian.
 Li Duo as Gao Bin
 Provincial governor of Northern Zhou.
 Feng Hui as Zhao Yue
 Advisor of Northern Zhou. Yuwen Hu's subordinate.
 Feng Qian as Zhao Gui
 General of Northern Zhou.
 Yang Mingwei as Yuwen Shu
 General of Sui.
 Gao Ye as Zheng Qiye
 Yang Su's wife. Close friend of Dugu Jialuo.
 Yang Sheng Yuan as Xu Zhuo
 Ally of Dugu Xin.
 Wang Hai Long as Chen Shubao
 Emperor of Chen dynasty.
 Yang Yu Lan as Yao Shanggong
 Head palace maid.

Soundtrack
Rong Dui Zhuang (戎对妆) - Joey Yung 
Yi Nian San Qian (一念三千) - Zhang Lei, Liu Xijun 
Tian Gao (天高) - Yisa Yu 
Xiu Xiu (休休) - Zeng Yiming

See also
The Legend of Dugu

References 

2019 web series debuts
Chinese historical television series
Tencent original programming
2019 Chinese television series debuts
2019 Chinese television series endings
Youku original programming
IQIYI original programming
Television series set in the Northern and Southern dynasties
Television series set in the Sui dynasty
Television series by Huace Media